The 1952 NCAA baseball season, play of college baseball in the United States organized by the National Collegiate Athletic Association (NCAA) began in the spring of 1952.  The season progressed through the regular season and concluded with the 1952 College World Series.  The College World Series, held for the sixth time in 1952, consisted of one team from each of eight geographical districts and was held in Omaha, Nebraska at Johnny Rosenblatt Stadium as a double-elimination tournament.  Holy Cross claimed the championship.

Conference winners
This is a partial list of conference champions from the 1952 season.  Each of the eight geographical districts chose, by various methods, the team that would represent them in the NCAA Tournament.  Conference champions had to be chosen, unless all conference champions declined the bid.

Conference standings
The following is an incomplete list of conference standings:

College World Series

The 1952 season marked the sixth NCAA Baseball Tournament, which consisted of the eight team College World Series.  The College World Series was held in Omaha, Nebraska.  Districts used a variety of selection methods to the event, from playoffs to a selection committee.  District playoffs were not considered part of the NCAA Tournament, and the expansion to eight teams resulted in the end of regionals as they existed from 1947 through 1949.  The eight teams played a double-elimination format, with Holy Cross claiming their first championship with an 8–4 win over Missouri in the final.

Award winners

All-America team

References